The Oskaloosa Herald is a semi-weekly newspaper published in Oskaloosa, Iowa, and covering Mahaska County, Iowa and Marion County, Iowa. The newspaper publishes semi-weekly on Tuesday and Friday, and also publishes the Oskaloosa Shopper. It is owned by CNHI.

History
The paper was founded by John R. Needham and Hugh McNelley in 1850.  Tri-Cities Newspapers acquired the paper in 1970.  Boone Newspapers took over ownership in 1975.  Donrey Media Group sold the paper to Community Newspaper Holdings in 1998.

References

External links 
 Oskaloosa Herald Website
 CNHI Website

Newspapers published in Iowa
Oskaloosa, Iowa
Publications established in 1850